Statistics of Nemzeti Bajnokság I in the 1992–93 season.

Overview
It was contested by 16 teams, and Kispest-Honvéd FC won the championship. An extra slot for the UEFA Cup was awarded to Hungary after the 1993 Polish football scandal.

League standings

Results

Relegation play-offs 

|}

Statistical leaders

Top goalscorers

References
Hungary - List of final tables (RSSSF)

Nemzeti Bajnokság I seasons
1
Hun